Janaq Paço (14 March 1914, Konitsa, Kingdom of Greece – 11 July 1991, Tirana, Albania) was one of the best known Albanian sculptors of the 20th century. Some of his prominent works include the monuments of Skanderbeg in Kruja, Tirana, and Pristina, Kosovo (reproduced post-mortem), as well as The Gladiators.

Life
Paço was of Aromanian origins. He studied first in his home town and then at the high school in Thessaloniki, Greece. Afterwards he entered the Athens School of Fine Arts in Athens. During his studies, Paço worked and studied with the Greek modern sculptor Costandinos Dimitriadis, himself a student of Auguste Rodin, and others.

He went to Albania in 1941. After World War II, he worked as a sculpture teacher in Artistic Lyceum "Jordan Misja" in Tirana, where he would teach all his life until retirement.

Paço was one of the founders of the Albanian sculpture school and tradition.

In addition to his realistic sculptures, Paço created also many nude sculptures during the 1960s and 1970s, and was obliged to destroy them, fearing punishment from the Communist Regime. During this time he was  criticized by other members of the Albanian League of Writers and Artists. This led him to gradually dissociate himself from the League.

Bibliography of art works 
Main part of his work:
 The monument of Skanderbeg in Krujë (started in 1949; finished in 1959), which was later copied in Pristina, Kosovo, after the 1998–1999 Kosovo War.
 The monument of Skanderbeg (1968), today in "Scanderbeg Square" in Tirana, where he co-worked with the first Albanian sculptor Odhise Paskali and Andrea Mano
 Two statues of Fan Noli, and one of Alexander Moissi (1960s)
 The Gladiators (1973) (3.5 m), anticipated to be placed at the entrance of the ancient Durrës Amphitheatre in Durrës 
 The sculptural group Skanderbeg with the People (1982), which is placed in the entrance of the Skanderbeg Museum in Krujë

Awards and prizes 
 In 1984, he was awarded the title People's Artist of Albania.
 At the exhibition "Spring '90" at the National Art Gallery of Albania, Paço won first prize with his art work Girl's Portrait, which one year earlier (before the fall of communism in Albania) was prohibited to be exhibited inside the gallery as a "modern art work".

See also 

 Ibrahim Kodra
 List of Albanians
 List of sculptors
 Modern Albanian art

References

External links 

 List of Articles from Albanian Library Bksh.al
    shqiperia.com
 
 

1914 births
1991 deaths
20th-century Albanian sculptors
20th-century sculptors
Albanian sculptors
Art educators
Athens School of Fine Arts alumni
People from Konitsa
Artists from Tirana
People's Artists of Albania
Albanian people of Aromanian descent